Mufti Abdul Shakoor is a Pakistani politician who is the current Federal Minister for Religious Affairs and Inter-faith Harmony, in office since 19 April 2022. He has been a member of the National Assembly of Pakistan since August 2018.

Political career
He was elected to the National Assembly of Pakistan as a candidate of Muttahida Majlis-e-Amal (MMA) from Constituency NA-51 (Tribal Area-XII) in 2018 Pakistani general election. He received 21,896 votes and defeated Qaiser Jamal.

External Link

More Reading
 List of members of the 15th National Assembly of Pakistan
 List of Pakistan Tehreek-e-Insaf elected members (2013–2018)
 No-confidence motion against Imran Khan

References

Living people
Pakistani MNAs 2018–2023
Muttahida Majlis-e-Amal MNAs
Year of birth missing (living people)